Dead Men Do Tell Tales may refer to:

Dead Men Do Tell Tales (book), a 1994 book by William R. Maples
"Dead Men Do Tell Tales", a 2006 episode of Heartbeat
"Dead Men Do Tell Tales", a 1982 episode of Minder